Song of the Bandits is an upcoming South Korean streaming television series directed by Hwang Jun-hyeok, written by Han Jeong-hoon, and starring Kim Nam-gil, Seohyun, Yoo Jae-myung, Lee Hyun-wook, and Lee Ho-jung. It is scheduled to be released on Netflix in the third quarter of 2023.

Synopsis 
Set in 1920s, during turbulent period of Japanese occupation, the people of Joseon have been deprived of their place of living and expelled to Japan. Those who headed to Gando, a land of lawlessness with different stories, unite as one to protect the homeland of Koreans.

Cast

Main 
 Kim Nam-gil as Lee Yoon
 A former Japanese soldier who left for Gando, leaving everything behind and became a thief protecting the land and people.
 Seohyun as Nam Hee-shin
 The head of the railway bureau of the Japanese Government-General of Korea who has hidden her true identity.
 Yoo Jae-myung as Choi Chung-soo
 A landowner of a Korean village located in Gando who is a independence activist.
 Lee Hyun-wook as Lee Kwang-il
 An opportunistic Japanese military officer who gets entangled with Lee Yoon in a terrible relationship.
 Lee Ho-jung as Eon Nyeon-i
 A gunman who goes to Gando after being commissioned to kill Lee Yoon.

Supporting 
 Kim Seol-jin as Kimura, a member of the Magic Band.

Production 
In August 2022, it was reported that the filming of the series has been suspended due to heavy rain. The filming ended on February 2, 2023.

References

External links
 
 
 

Upcoming Netflix original programming
Korean-language Netflix original programming
South Korean action television series
South Korean web series
2023 web series debuts
2023 South Korean television series debuts
South Korean historical television series
Television series by Urban Works Media
Television series by Studio Dragon
Television series set in the 1920s
Television series set in Korea under Japanese rule
Yanbian in fiction